This is a list of notable economists aligned with the Austrian School who are sometimes colloquially called "the Austrians". This designation applies even though few hold Austrian citizenship; moreover, not all economists from Austria subscribe to the ideas of the Austrian School.

Austrian economists

Related lists

 List of economists
 List of liberal theorists

References

Further reading

External links
 
 The Austrian Economists by Eugen von Böhm-Bawerk 1891
 Society for the Development of Austrian Economics Largest professional organization of Austrian economists.

Austrian School economists